Viktoria von Ballasko (24 January 1909, Vienna – 10 May 1976, Berlin) was an Austrian actress.

She was born Viktoria Maria Franziska Ballasko.

Partial filmography

 Der Kaiser von Kalifornien (1936) - Anna, seine Frau
 Kinderarzt Dr. Engel (1936) - Maria Winkler
 Ball at the Metropol (1937) - Gertrude Selle
 The Citadel of Warsaw (1937) - Anna Lasotzka
 The Marriage Swindler (1938) - Marianne, seine Tochter
 Schwarzfahrt ins Glück (1938) - Privatsekretärin Trude Holm
 A Prussian Love Story (1938) - Prinzessin Auguste - ihre Tochter
 Die Geliebte (1939) - Therese
 Mann für Mann (1939) - Else Zügel
 Robert Koch (1939) - Schwester Else
 Kennwort Machin (1939) - Marie-Henriette Borb, genannt Mette
 Krambambuli (1940) - Anna Sonnleitner
 Herz geht vor Anker (1940) - Hanna Peters
 Im Schatten des Berges (1940) - Veronica Zumtobel
 The Girl from Fano (1941) - Ipkes Frau Angens
 Heimaterde (1941)
 Gefährtin meines Sommers (1943) - Hanna Polenz, Frau des Müllers
The Master of the Estate (1943) - Amelie von Linden
 Die unheimliche Wandlung des Alex Roscher (1943) - Grete Steinbauer, Alex' Braut
 Das Leben geht weiter (1945) - Frau Kolling
 Und wieder 48 (1948) - Betty
 Our Daily Bread (1949) - Martha Webers
 The Guilt of Doctor Homma (1951) - Karen Homma
 A Musical War of Love (1953) - Fräulein Canisius
 The Witch (1954)
 Beichtgeheimnis (1956) - Wirtschafterin
 Wolfpack (1956) - Mutter Borchert
 Made in Germany (1957) - Frau Löber (final film role)

Bibliography
 Fox, Jo. Filming Women in the Third Reich. Berg, 2000.
 Hull, David Stewart. Film in the Third Reich: a study of the German cinema, 1933-1945. University of California Press, 1969.

External links

1909 births
1976 deaths
Austrian film actresses
Actresses from Vienna
20th-century Austrian actresses